is a Japanese equestrian. He competed at the 1996 Summer Olympics and the 2000 Summer Olympics.

References

External links
 

1969 births
Living people
Japanese male equestrians
Olympic equestrians of Japan
Equestrians at the 1996 Summer Olympics
Equestrians at the 2000 Summer Olympics
Sportspeople from Hokkaido
Asian Games medalists in equestrian
Equestrians at the 2002 Asian Games
Asian Games gold medalists for Japan
Medalists at the 2002 Asian Games